On May 15, 2006 the United States Department of Defense acknowledged that there were three Mauritanian captives held in Guantanamo.

The Guantanamo Bay detainment camps were opened on January 11, 2002 at the Guantanamo Bay Naval Base, in Cuba. The Bush administration asserted that all captives taken in the "global war on terror" could be held there, in extrajudicial detention, without revealing their names. The Associated Press had filed a Freedom of Information Act request for the names of all the captives. The Department of Defense justified keeping the information secret on the grounds of protecting the captives' privacy, as they had not been charged with crimes. After exhausting legal appeals, the Department of Defense were forced, by a court order, to release the identities of all the Guantanamo captives.

WTOP reported in 2006 that one of the Mauritanians held in Guantanamo had been transferred to United States officers by former leader Maaouya Sid'Ahmed Ould Taya.

Known Guantanamo detainees from Mauritania

References

Mauritanian